Cliver is a surname. Notable people with the surname include:

Al Cliver (born 1951), Italian actor
Rose Cliver, San Francisco earthquake survivor